Goniosaurus is an extinct genus of plesiosaur from the Late Cretaceous (Maastrichtian age) of the Nekum Chalk, in Netherlands. The only species so far described, G. binskhorsti is represented only by an isolated, compressed and slender tooth described by Hermman Meyer and a referred tooth and a cervical vertebra that shows that was an elasmosaurid, as many others Late Cretaceous plesiosaurs from Europe.

See also

 List of plesiosaur genera
 Timeline of plesiosaur research

References

Elasmosaurids
Sauropterygian genera